Thomas George Prescott (8 January 1875–1957) was an English footballer who played in the Football League for Notts County.

References

1875 births
1957 deaths
English footballers
Association football forwards
English Football League players
Notts County F.C. players